Virbi parish is an administrative unit of Talsi Municipality, Latvia.

Towns, villages and settlements of Virbi parish 
  – parish administrative center

References 

Parishes of Latvia
Talsi Municipality